The University of Blida is a university located in Blida, Algeria. Founded in 1981 and named after Saad Dahlab an Algerian nationalist and politician.
Schools :

 Sciences school
 School of technology
 medical school
 School of Natural and life sciences

Institutes :

 Veterinary institute
 Institute for aeronautics and aerospace studies
 Institute for architecture and urban studies
 Institute for applied sciences and processes

The university of Blida hosts every year international students in all of its schools and institutes.

See also
 List of universities in Algeria

External links
 Official website

Blida
Blida
Buildings and structures in Blida Province